In enzymology, a hexaprenyldihydroxybenzoate methyltransferase is an enzyme that catalyzes the chemical reaction

S-adenosyl-L-methionine + 3-hexaprenyl-4,5-dihydroxybenzoate  S-adenosyl-L-homocysteine + 3-hexaprenyl-4-hydroxy-5-methoxybenzoate

Thus, the two substrates of this enzyme are S-adenosyl methionine and 3-hexaprenyl-4,5-dihydroxybenzoate, whereas its two products are S-adenosylhomocysteine and 3-hexaprenyl-4-hydroxy-5-methoxybenzoate.

This enzyme belongs to the family of transferases, specifically those transferring one-carbon group methyltransferases.  The systematic name of this enzyme class is S-adenosyl-L-methionine:3-hexaprenyl-4,5-dihydroxylate O-methyltransferase. Other names in common use include 3,4-dihydroxy-5-hexaprenylbenzoate methyltransferase, and dihydroxyhexaprenylbenzoate methyltransferase.  This enzyme participates in ubiquinone biosynthesis.

References

 

EC 2.1.1
Enzymes of unknown structure